Ivan Jakovljević (born 26 May 1989) is a Serbian footballer who plays for NK Vuteks-Sloga. His preferred position is right back, where he has played throughout his career.

Honours
Radnik Bijeljina
Bosnia and Herzegovina Football Cup: 2015–16

References

1989 births
Living people
Sportspeople from Pristina
Serbian footballers
FK ČSK Čelarevo players
NK Zvijezda Gradačac players
Szigetszentmiklósi TK footballers
FK Radnik Bijeljina players
Flamurtari Vlorë players
Luftëtari Gjirokastër players
Kategoria Superiore players
Association football defenders